"As Long as You Love Me" is a song by Canadian singer Justin Bieber from his third studio album, Believe (2012). The track features American rapper Big Sean. It was written by Eric H, and was produced by Rodney "Darkchild" Jerkins and Andre Lindal. It was first released on July 10, 2012, as a promotional single from the album, and one month later it was released as the album's second single.

The song has since charted in the United Kingdom, first at number thirty as a promotional single with first-week sales of 11,598, and then after being released as a single it improved its position on the UK Singles Chart, reaching number 22. On Billboards Rhythmic Airplay Chart, the single reached number one, giving Bieber his first number one single on an American airplay music chart. It peaked at number six on the Billboard Hot 100.

It also reached the number one position on Billboards Dance/Mix Show Airplay chart, making Bieber the fifth Canadian artist to reach that position after Martin Solveig featuring Dragonette's "Hello" in 2011. The song has sold 2,240,000 copies in the US  The music video features actor Michael Madsen.

Background and release
In late 2011, Bieber confirmed to radio network Capital FM that he was recording material for his third studio album, which was originally going to be released in early 2012. He later spoke to MTV News and revealed that Believe would surprise people in different ways, since it musically is a departure from his previous works. While Bieber has said that he wants his next release to recall Justin Timberlake's Future Sex/Love Sounds sonically, in an interview with V magazine, he noted that what he'll be singing is a bit more PG than the topics Timberlake covered on that album:
"I'm not going to try to conform to what people want me to be or go out there and start partying, have people see me with alcohol. I want to do it at my own pace. I don't want to start singing about things like sex, drugs and swearing. I'm into love, and maybe I'll get more into making love when I'm older. I want to be someone who is respected by everybody."

After releasing "Boyfriend" as the lead single, Bieber announced that he will release promotional singles to promote Believe. The first promotional single "Die in Your Arms" was released to iTunes on May 29, 2012. The second "All Around The World" was released on iTunes on June 4, 2012. "As Long as You Love Me" was released on June 11, 2012, as the third and final promotional single.

The cover art for "As Long as You Love Me" shows Bieber perched on a wooden stool, holding an acoustic guitar. Sia Nicole of Idolator expressed dissatisfaction with the cover, saying "It’s false advertising for the high-fidelity track that has nary a strum within earshot."

Composition and lyrics
"As Long as You Love Me" was written by Bieber, Nasri Atweh, and guest vocalist Big Sean, while production was handled by Darkchild, The Messengers and Andre Lindal. The song is officially written in the key of C minor. It is heavily influenced by dubstep, with vocal loops complemented by a booming beat. As the song continues, it builds and builds to a Rave-ready drop.

Lyrically, it tells listeners that true love can defy all circumstances and the obstacles that it can overcome. "As long as you love me/ We could be starving/ We could be homeless/ We could be broke," Bieber sings over a staccato beat and handclaps, with an undercurrent of a swirling-sounding synth. "As long as you love me/ I'll be your platinum/ I'll be your silver/ I'll be your gold," he adds. Big Sean drops a rap exalting a lady love, too. "I don't know if this makes sense, but you're my hallelujah/ Give me a time and a place, and I'll rendezvous, and I'll fly you to it," Sean raps.

Critical reception
The song received critical acclaim by music critics. Jon Caramanica of The New York Times described the song as "a dubstep love song, with Mr. Bieber reaching into falsetto at points without losing power, and showing restraint at the chorus." Natalie Shaw of BBC Music wrote, "It's fine that his vocal simpers on the verses of As Long As You Love Me, because the song's pulsating undercurrent propels it onto the dancefloor." Hermione Hoby of The Observer complimented his vocals, calling "plaintive and still unmistakably teenage." Jason Lipshutz of Billboard defined the track: "A massive yet somehow intimate dance track, with the drums almost reaching hair metal levels in their vibrations. The Biebs handles his business, but Big Sean's verse probably isn't necessary."

Becky Bain of Idolator commented, "The electro-infused track carries your basic we-don’t-need-money-we-have-love sentiment, while Big Sean cameo is mostly useless, but it does come at a pivotal moment in the Darkchild-produced tune."

In his review for Fact Magazine, Alex Macpherson described the track:
"'As Long As You Love Me' is a post-austerity, us-against-the-world electronic storm in which Bieber promises romantic fealty even as he's buffeted this way and that by a cornucopia of sonic switch-ups courtesy of Darkchild: the 4×4 march leading up to the peak of the second chorus, the way the word 'love' is caught, cut up and tossed into a digital swirl until it becomes helpless surrender. Notably and surprisingly, too, Bieber's own delivery stands out: his blend of puppy-eyed pleading and genuine tenderness on the line 'We could be homeless, we could be broke' is the song's emotional pivot. It's enough to make you jealous of those terrifyingly devoted Beliebers: imagine how much more intensely they’re feeling this."

Music video
As part of promotion for "As Long As You Love Me", a music video, which was filmed in early July 2012, was released. Prior to the release of the video, Bieber revealed that a minute-long clip of the video was due to be broadcast following an episode of The Voice; however, much to the displeasure of Bieber and his fans, the clip wasn't shown. NBC later revealed that technical difficulties prevented the clip from being aired. The full video was later premiered on Bieber's official YouTube page on July 12, 2012. Bieber very rarely referred to the video as a "music video", but rather as a "short film". Directed by Anthony Mandler, cinematography by David Devlin, and edited by Jacquelyn London the video was Bieber's longest music video at five minutes and fifty-two seconds, before being surpassed by "Confident" at six minutes and six seconds. It featured guest appearances by Michael Madsen and Big Sean, the latter of which performs the rapping on the track. The video was filmed in Los Angeles, California. The actress in the music video is Chanel Celaya.

Synopsis
The video starts with a flashback to an overprotective father telling Bieber to stay away from his daughter, whom Bieber is dating. In the present, Bieber walks up to a payphone and tries to call his girlfriend, but she does not answer. Bieber is then seen dancing outside the mansion of his girlfriend's father, and running through the corridors in a panic. When he realizes she isn't there, he drives off in his car to find her. As he finds her in her bedroom, they stare at each other through the glass windows. Bieber then sneaks her out of her bedroom and hurries her into his car, just as her father sees him. He drives down the freeway for a few miles, with his girlfriend's father close behind, then finally pulls over. As Bieber steps out of the car, the man viciously beats him. It is then revealed, through a series of flashbacks, the father was, in fact, jealous that his daughter cared more about Bieber than him. The video ends with a bloodied Bieber looking into the camera.

Throughout the video, scenes of Justin and his love interest spending quality times in various scenes (such as on her bed, at the park and on a rooftop) are shown, displaying their love for each other.

Live performances
Bieber performed the song for the first time in Oslo, Norway, at the Oslo Opera House, on May 30, 2012, at his Believe promo tour. Also Bieber performed the song, with Big Sean, on the Today Show on June 15, 2012, and again with Big Sean at the 2012 Teen Choice Awards, in a medley with "Boyfriend". Bieber also performed the song, once again with Big Sean, during the season finale of the NBC summer reality talent show America's Got Talent. He also performed in late September on Dancing with the Stars, and on the February 9, 2013, episode of Saturday Night Live, which he also hosted. Bieber has also performed the song on the 2012 Victoria's Secret Fashion show on November 7, 2012, in a medley with "Boyfriend". On March 28, 2015, Bieber performed a duet with Ariana Grande on The Honeymoon Tour in Miami. Bieber performed the song at the 2015 Wango Tango.

Track listings

Charts

Weekly charts

Year-end charts

Certifications

Release history

Promotional releases

Single releases

References

2012 singles
Justin Bieber songs
Island Records singles
Schoolboy Records singles
Big Sean songs
Dubstep songs
Music videos directed by Anthony Mandler
Songs written by Andre Lindal
Songs written by Nasri (musician)
Songs written by Justin Bieber
Songs written by Big Sean
Songs written by Rodney Jerkins
2012 songs
Torch songs